Pennsylvania's 22nd congressional district was one of Pennsylvania's districts of the United States House of Representatives.

Geography
Created in 1833, the district served portions of the city of Pittsburgh. In 1843 the district moved to northwest Pennsylvania.  In 1853 the district returned to Pittsburgh.  In 1903 the district included many of the counties around Pittsburgh.  In 1923 the district was moved to York.

History

This district was created in 1833.  The district was eliminated in 1993.

List of members representing the district

References

 
 
 Congressional Biographical Directory of the United States 1774–present

22
Former congressional districts of the United States
Constituencies established in 1833
1833 establishments in Pennsylvania
Constituencies disestablished in 1993
1993 disestablishments in Pennsylvania